Norm Macdonald Live was a weekly audio and video podcast hosted by Canadian stand-up comedian, writer and actor Norm Macdonald. The Comedy Store's Adam Eget (b. 1979) served as the show's co-host, with former Late Show with David Letterman producer Daniel Kellison as executive producer. 

The show featured interviews with comedians, actors, and other members of the entertainment community, and ran for three seasons. Launched by the Video Podcast Network on March 26, 2013, and then produced by Jash, the show was also distributed on YouTube, Amazon Prime, and PlutoTV, with audio-only versions of the episodes uploaded via iTunes.

On February 16, 2018, archived episodes of the show were taken off of YouTube, followed by most major digital platforms. Norm Macdonald Has a Show, a spiritual successor to Norm Macdonald Live starring Macdonald and Eget, was released on Netflix on September 14, 2018.

Background 
The first season premiered on March 26, 2013, and concluded after eleven episodes. After a year-long hiatus, the second season debuted on May 12, 2014. It concluded after thirteen episodes in August 2014.

A third season was released in September and October 2016, but only aired 2 episodes before going on hiatus. On July 25, 2017, the season continued with guest David Letterman. The recommencement of the third season featured a brand-new set as well as a new style of filming that seemed to prefer close-up camera shots on subjects rather than the traditional medium close-up.

Format 
The podcast followed a talk show format, yet without a studio audience. Each hour-long episode features opening remarks between Macdonald and co-host Adam Eget, often involving elaborate comedic bits and irreverent chit-chat, leading into a guest interview. The show concludes with a segment called "Jokes," in which the hosts and their guest take turns reading one-liners from index cards.

Episodes

Season one

Season two

Season three

Specials
In the spirit of the Sports Show with Norm Macdonald, Norm and co-hosts Jeff Martin and Chad Drew live-streamed their coverage of the US Masters golf tournament over several hours in 2013, and again in 2015. 

The show featured special call-in guests, including Sid Youngers, Josh Gardner and Bob Einstein.

Critical reception 
Reviews for the series were positive, with warm notices from USA Today and Entertainment Weekly. Darren Staley of America's Comedy wrote "The show is at all times smart, unpredictable, thought-provoking, and funny as hell," arguing that "It's the best podcast out there right now." Writing for IFC, Ron Mwangaguhunga called Macdonald "a comedic force with which to be reckoned," noting that the show was "a bit rough around the edges," in its first episode.

References

External links
 Norm Macdonald Live at the Internet Archive

Comedy and humor podcasts
Video podcasts
Audio podcasts
2013 podcast debuts
Norm Macdonald
Interview podcasts
2018 podcast endings
Canadian podcasts